Adyen is a Dutch payment company with the status of an acquiring bank that allows businesses to accept e-commerce, mobile, and point-of-sale payments. It is listed on the stock exchange Euronext Amsterdam.

Adyen offers merchants online services for merchants to accept electronic payments using payment methods including credit cards, debit cards, wire transfers, and real-time bank transfers based on online banking. It connects merchants to different payment methods, including international credit cards, local cash-based methods, and mobile payment methods. The technology platform acts as a payment gateway and a payment service provider.

History
Adyen was founded in 2006 by Pieter van der Does and Arnout Schuijff, now the CEO and CTO respectively. Headquartered in Amsterdam, the company employs around 2,000 people in offices in twenty three countries.

The name Adyen means 'start again' in Sranan Tongo. This is a reference to this being the second project of the founders, after Bibit.

In 2012, Adyen started to expand globally, opening its offices in San Francisco, Paris, and London. In the same year, it obtained its pan-European acquiring license.

In 2015, Adyen achieved a valuation of $2.3 billion, making it the sixth largest European unicorn.

In 2016, it obtained an acquiring license in Brazil through a BIN sponsorship. In the same year, Adyen was ranked #10 on the Forbes Cloud 100 list.

In April 2017, the company was granted a European banking license, which gives it the status of an acquiring bank. It also obtained acquiring licenses in Singapore, Hong Kong, Australia, and New Zealand.

On 24 May 2018, the company announced that it would be making the company public by listing shares publicly in Amsterdam. The IPO took place on 13 June 2018.

In 2019, Adyen opened new offices in Tokyo and Mumbai, and expanded its payment offering in Africa. In the same year, it launched Adyen Issuing, a virtual and physical card-issuing business to complement payments services to merchants.

In 2020, the company benefited from an accelerated digitalization of global ecommerce in the online retail segment, which compensated the declining travel volumes in enterprises, due to the COVID-19 pandemic. It launched mobile Android POS devices worldwide in the second half of the year. In addition, it opened a new office in Dubai, expanding its offering in the Middle East.

Growth
The company has been profitable since 2011. Its earnings grew from $46 million in 2015 to $87 million in 2016. Its gross revenue grew 99 percent in 2016 to $727 million.

In December 2014, the company announced a funding round of $250 million led by growth equity firm General Atlantic, joined by existing investors Temasek Holdings, Index Ventures, and Felicis Ventures.

In 2016, the company saw transaction volume increase to $90 billion, up from $50 billion in 2015.

In 2017, Adyen surpassed €100 billion in processed volume.

On January 31, 2018 eBay announced that it had signed an agreement with Adyen to become its primary payments processing partner. eBay began intermediation on a small scale in North America starting in the second half of 2018, expanding in 2019 under the terms of the operating agreement with PayPal. In 2021, eBay transitioned a majority of its marketplace customers to Adyen.

In 2020, Adyen had a net revenue of €684 million, a 28% increase year-on-year.

In 2021, net revenue hit €1 billion.

References

Financial services companies established in 2006
Payment service providers
Companies based in Amsterdam
Companies in the Euro Stoxx 50
Companies listed on Euronext Amsterdam